Symphyotrichum fendleri (formerly Aster fendleri) is a species of flowering plant in the family Asteraceae native to the mid- and south-central United States, including Great Plains states and extending into Texas and New Mexico. Commonly known as Fendler's aster, it is a perennial, herbaceous plant that may reach  in height. Its flowers have lavender to purple ray florets and yellow then reddish purple disk florets.

Gallery

Citations

References

fendleri
Flora of the North-Central United States
Flora of the South-Central United States
Plants described in 1849
Taxa named by Asa Gray